BUH is the IATA airport code for either of the two airports of Bucharest, Romania:

Henri Coandă International Airport, in Otopeni
Aurel Vlaicu International Airport, in Băneasa

See also
Buh (disambiguation)